Icariotis scapularis is a species of beetle in the family Cerambycidae. It was described by Pascoe in 1888.

References

Dorcasominae
Beetles described in 1888